Bernard "Ben" Turpin (September 19, 1869 – July 1, 1940) was an American comedian and actor, best remembered for his work in silent films. His trademarks were his cross-eyed appearance and adeptness at vigorous physical comedy. Turpin worked with notable performers such as Charlie Chaplin and Laurel and Hardy, and was a part of the Mack Sennett studio team. He is believed to have been the first filmed "victim" of the pie in the face gag. When sound came to films, Turpin chose to retire, having invested profitably in real estate, although he did do occasional cameos.

Personal life

Turpin was born in New Orleans, Louisiana, on September 19, 1869, the son of a candy store owner, Ernest Turpin, and Sarah Buckley.

Turpin and his first wife, actress Carrie Lemieux, were married in Chicago on February 18, 1907. In 1923, Mrs. Turpin became ill with influenza, which caused the loss of her hearing.  Heartbroken, Turpin took his seriously ill wife to the Basilica of Sainte-Anne-de-Beaupré in Quebec, hoping she would be healed. She eventually became an invalid, with Turpin placing his career on hold to care for her. Carrie died on October 2, 1925. Turpin remarried on July 8, 1926, to Babette Dietz in Los Angeles.

He was a Roman Catholic, and a member of the Good Shepherd Parish and the Catholic Motion Picture Guild in Beverly Hills, California.

Vaudeville
Turpin worked in vaudeville, burlesque, and circuses. He had a distinctive appearance, with a small wiry frame, a brush mustache, and crossed eyes. Turpin's famous eyes, he said, only crossed as a young adult after he suffered an accident. He was convinced that the crossed eyes were essential to his comic career; his co-workers recalled that after he received any blow to the head he made a point of looking himself in the mirror to assure himself that they had not become uncrossed. He was a devout Catholic, and his workmates occasionally goaded him by threatening to pray that his eyes would uncross, thus depriving him of his livelihood.

Turpin famously bought a $25,000 insurance policy with Lloyd's of London, payable if his eyes ever uncrossed. A 1920 version of the story had the amount upped $100,000.
 
He developed a vigorous style of physical comedy, including an ability to stage comic pratfalls that impressed even his fellow workers in the rough-and-tumble world of silent comedy. One of his specialties was a forward tumble he called the "hundred an' eight". It was basically an interrupted forward somersault initiated by kicking one leg up, turning over 180 degrees to land flat on the back or in a seated position.

Film

Turpin first appeared on film in 1907 for Essanay Studios in Chicago in various small parts and comic bits. In addition to his on-screen work, he worked as a carpenter and janitor for Essanay. In the 1909 film Mr. Flip, Turpin receives what is believed to have been the first pie-in-the-face.  

Charlie Chaplin joined the Essanay company in 1915, and the studio made Turpin his second banana. Chaplin was maturing as a filmmaker, working slowly and intuitively. Turpin, however, was impatient with Chaplin's methods. The earthy Turpin understood straightforward slapstick more than comic subtlety. The Chaplin–Turpin duo did not last long, with Chaplin abandoning Chicago for California. Turpin does share one additional credit with Chaplin: after Chaplin filmed Burlesque on Carmen in two reels, Essanay filmed new scenes with Turpin to pad the picture into a featurette, doubling its length.

Essanay did not survive Chaplin's departure and remained solvent for only a few more years. Turpin may have been aware of Essanay's instability; he left for the Vogue comedy company, where he starred in a series of two-reel comedies. Former Essanay comedian Paddy McQuire supported him. Many of Turpin's Vogue comedies were re-released under different titles, to cash in on Turpin's subsequent stardom.

Mack Sennett and stardom

In 1917, Ben Turpin joined the leading comedy company, the Mack Sennett studio. Turpin's aptitude for crude slapstick suited the Sennett style perfectly, and Sennett's writers often cast the ridiculous-looking Turpin against type (a rugged Yukon miner; a suave, worldly lover; a stalwart cowboy; a fearless stuntman, etc.) for maximum comic effect. Through the 1920s his roles often spoofed serious actors and celebrities of the time – e.g., "The Shriek" for "The Sheik" – and Turpin became one of film's most popular comics. Turpin appeared in both short subjects and feature films for Sennett. Delighted with his success, he took to introducing himself with the phrase, "I'm Ben Turpin; I make $3,000 a week."

Sennett terminated most of his staff's contracts in 1928, and closed the studio to retool for the new talking pictures. Turpin was signed by the low-budget Weiss Brothers-Artclass company, perhaps the most ambitious coup that Artclass ever attempted. Turpin made two-reel comedies there for one year. Artclass usually traded on his peculiar vision with titles like Idle Eyes and The Eyes Have It.

Turpin in the sound era

1929 saw many silent-film stars uncertain about their future employment, with the new talking pictures requiring new skills and techniques. Ben Turpin chose to retire. He had invested his earnings in real estate, and, being highly successful at this, had no financial need for more work. Producers soon sought him out for gag appearances in films. Turpin's speaking voice was a gritty rasp that retained elements of the New Orleans "Yat" accent of his youth. He commanded a flat fee of $1000 per appearance, regardless of whether it was a speaking role or a fleeting cameo. Among the most memorable of these cameos was in Paramount's Million Dollar Legs (1932) starring W. C. Fields, Jack Oakie, and Susan Fleming (the future wife of Harpo Marx of The Marx Brothers fames).

He starred in only one more film, the short subject Keystone Hotel (Warner Bros., 1935), a reunion of silent-era comedians. His last feature film was Laurel and Hardy's Saps at Sea in 1940, in which his cross-eyed face served as a joke punchline. He was paid his $1000 for one quick shot of his face and just 16 words of dialogue. Death prevented his scheduled appearance in Charlie Chaplin's The Great Dictator.

Death
Ben Turpin died July 1, 1940, of a heart attack and was interred in the Forest Lawn Memorial Park Cemetery in Glendale, California, following a Requiem Mass at the Church of the Good Shepherd in Beverly Hills. He was eulogized as "a fine member of his church, strong in his faith" by Father J. P. Concannon.  His pallbearers included Andy Clyde, Billy Bevan, James Finlayson, Heinie Conklin, and Charlie Murray.

Turpin had been close friends with Andy Clyde and James Finlayson, with Clyde having been the witness at Turpin's second wedding, and Turpin having been one of the witnesses signing Finlayson's petition for naturalization.

Turpin's crossed eyes
Turpin and Sennett both appeared as themselves (in Technicolor) in Hollywood Cavalcade (1939), a partly fictionalized movie about the silent-film era. This movie contains a sequence in which Turpin reports for work and prepares to go onto the set in character. In the dressing room he picks up a hand mirror and checks his reflection as he deliberately crosses his eyes as extremely as possible. In this sequence, it can be seen that Turpin's left eye was actually normal when he was not performing and that he intentionally crossed it (to match his misaligned right eye) as part of his screen character.

In the film The Comic (1969), Mickey Rooney plays a fictional silent-film comedian named "Cockeye Van Buren", who is genuinely cross-eyed. Although this character does not otherwise resemble Turpin, the handicap given to Rooney's role is clearly inspired by Turpin.

Filmography

See also
Age fabrication

References

Selective bibliography

External links 

 
 Turpin biography on entertainment.msn.com
 Ben Turpin at Virtual History
 "BEN TURPIN: The Rear Guard of Saxicolous Wayfarers of Cinematic Finitude"
 Mr. Flip available for free download from Internet Archive
 Ben Turpin on the cover of Life magazine, posthumously(9 years after his death), September 5 1949
 Turpin in "The Florodora Boys" skit (at 3:45), speaking a verse and performing his signature somersault
 Ben Turpin Collection at The Historic New Orleans Collection

1869 births
1940 deaths
Vaudeville performers
Silent film comedians
American male film actors
American male silent film actors
American male comedians
Male actors from New Orleans
Burials at Forest Lawn Memorial Park (Glendale)
20th-century American male actors
20th-century American comedians
American Roman Catholics
Comedians from Louisiana
American male comedy actors